Aethiophysa invisalis is a moth in the family Crambidae. It was described by Achille Guenée in 1854. It is found in French Guiana and North America, where it has been recorded from Alabama, Florida, Illinois, Indiana, Maryland, Michigan, Missouri, Ohio, Oklahoma, Ontario, Quebec, South Carolina, Tennessee, Texas and West Virginia.

References

Glaphyriinae
Moths described in 1854
Moths of North America
Moths of South America